Y Gyrn is a top of Pen y Fan in South Wales, situated in the Brecon Beacons National Park. Tommy Jones' Obelisk is found in between the summit and Corn Du.

The summit is a boggy mound overlooking the A470 and the Storey Arms. It is marked by a pile of stones.

External links
 www.geograph.co.uk : photos of Pen y Fan and surrounding area

References

Brecon Beacons
Mountains and hills of Powys
Tourist attractions in Powys
Hewitts of Wales
Nuttalls

cy:Pen y Fan